On May 10, 2010, President Barack Obama announced his selection of Elena Kagan for Associate Justice of the Supreme Court of the United States, to replace retiring Justice John Paul Stevens. Kagan's nomination was confirmed by a 63–37 vote of the United States Senate on August 5, 2010. When nominated, Kagan was Solicitor General of the United States, a position to which Obama had appointed her in March 2009. Kagan was the first Supreme Court nominee since Sandra Day O'Connor in 1981 to not be a sitting circuit court judge and the most recent such nominee as of 2023. She was the first Supreme Court nominee since William Rehnquist and Lewis F. Powell Jr. in 1971 to not be a sitting judge on any court.

Nomination

Potential candidates
On April 9, 2010, John Paul Stevens announced that he would retire from the Supreme Court on June 29, at the start of Court's summer 2010 recess. He had served as an associate justice for 34 years. Those considered front-runners for the nomination by press reports, in addition to Elena Kagan, were Diane Wood and Merrick Garland. Kagan had also been a finalist for the Court vacancy one year earlier, when Justice Sonia Sotomayor was selected to succeed the retiring David Souter.

Announcement

President Barack Obama announced the nomination of Elena Kagan to the Supreme Court on May 10, 2010. He praised Kagan as a "consensus builder", and said that she "is widely regarded as one of the nation's foremost legal minds". The nomination was formally received by the Senate that same day, and was subsequently referred to the Judiciary Committee.

Response to the nomination
In the Senate, Kagan's nomination was received positively by most Democrats. Judiciary Committee chairman Patrick Leahy applauded Kagan's experience and qualifications. In doing so, he called attention to her work in academia and with the federal governmentnoting that both were outside the so-called "judicial monastery" from which most contemporary justices have come. The last justices to join the Court without any prior judicial experience had been Lewis Powell and William Rehnquist, both appointed by President Richard Nixon in 1972.

Republicans were quick to express criticism, particularly over her handling of military recruiters during her time as Dean of Harvard Law School, as well as her work as a law clerk for the late Justice Thurgood Marshall, whom many of them deemed a liberal activist. Even so, minority whip Jon Kyl, who supported Kagan's nominations for solicitor general (a "temporary political appointment") but was reticent to support her associate justice (a "lifetime appointment"), all but ruled out using a filibuster to block a final Senate floor vote on the nomination, telling  CBS's Face the Nation, "The filibuster should be relegated to extreme circumstances, and I don't think Elena Kagan represents that." Opposition to Kagan among Senate Republicans was not universal however. A few expressed support for her, including Lindsey Graham, Susan Collins and Richard Lugar.

The deans of over one-third of the country's law schools, 69 people in total, endorsed Elena Kagan's nomination in an open letter in early June. The letter lauded what it considered her coalition-building skills and "understanding of both doctrine and policy" as well as her written record of legal analysis.

The National Rifle Association announced its opposition to Kagan, and stated that it would score the vote on her confirmation, meaning that Senators who vote in favor of Kagan would receive a lower rating from the organization. At the same time, the Brady Campaign to Prevent Gun Violence announced its support for Kagan's nomination.

Judiciary Committee review

Confirmation hearings

Kagan's Confirmation hearing before the Senate Judiciary Committee began on June 28, 2010. From the 28th through the 30th, Kagan underwent two rounds of questioning by each member of the committee.

Several witnesses were called to give testimony before the Judiciary Committee at the hearings. These witnesses included Kim Askew and William J. Kayatta, Jr. of the American Bar Association. The Democratic members of the committee called witnesses that included:
 Professor Robert C. Clark, Harvard University Distinguished Service Professor, Austin Wakeman Scott Professor of Law, and former Dean, Harvard Law School
 Fernande "Nan" Duffly, Associate Justice, Massachusetts Court of Appeals, on behalf of the National Association of Women Judges
 Greg Garre, Partner, Latham & Watkins, former Solicitor General of the United States
 Jennifer Gibbins, Executive Director, Prince William Soundkeeper
 Jack Goldsmith, Professor of Law, Harvard University
 Marcia Greenberger, Founder and Co-President, National Women's Law Center
 Jack Gross, plaintiff, Gross v. FBL Financial Services, Inc.
 Lilly Ledbetter, plaintiff, Ledbetter v. Goodyear Tire & Rubber Co.
 Professor Ronald Sullivan, Edward R. Johnston Lecturer on Law, Director of the Criminal Justice Institute, Harvard Law School
 Kurt White, President, Harvard Law Armed Forces Association

Republican members of the committee called the following witnesses:
 Robert Alt, Senior Fellow and Deputy Director, Center for Legal and Judicial Studies, The Heritage Foundation
 Lt. Gen. William "Jerry" Boykin, United States Army (ret.)
 Capt. Pete Hegseth, Army National Guar* Commissioner Peter Kirsanow, Benesch Law Firm
 David Kopel, Esq., Research Director, Independence Institute
 Colonel Thomas N. Moe, United States Air Force (ret.)
 David Norcross, Esq., Blank Rome
 William J. Olson, Esq., William J. Olson, P.C.
 Tony Perkins, President, Family Research Council
 Stephen Presser, Raoul Berger Professor of Legal History, Northwestern University School of Law
 Ronald Rotunda, The Doy & Dee Henley Chair and Distinguished Professor of Jurisprudence, Chapman University School of Law
 Ed Whelan, President, Ethics and Public Policy Center
 Dr. Charmaine Yoest, President & CEO, Americans United for Life
 Capt. Flagg Youngblood, United States Army

Committee vote
After the completion of testimony, Republicans on the Judiciary Committee successfully delayed a vote on forwarding the nomination to the full Senate for one week. On July 20, the committee voted 13–6 to endorse and forward the nomination, with only one Republican, Lindsey Graham, voting in the affirmative.

Full Senate vote

The Senate confirmed Elena Kagan to be an associate justice of the Supreme Court on August 5, 2010, by a vote of 63–37. All Democrats, except for Ben Nelson, voted for her, as did Independents Joe Lieberman and Bernie Sanders, and five Republicans: Susan Collins, Lindsey Graham, Judd Gregg, Richard Lugar, and Olympia Snowe.

Kagan's swearing-in ceremony as Associate Justice took place on August 7, 2010, at the White House. Chief Justice John Roberts administered the prescribed constitutional and judicial oaths of office, at which time she became the 112th justice (100th associate justice) of the Supreme Court.

See also

 Demographics of the Supreme Court of the United States
 Barack Obama Supreme Court candidates

Notes

References

Further reading

External links
Kagan Faces Confirmation Questioning on Political Leanings, Guns, Military Recruiting, and Abortion - video report by Democracy Now!
 The Nomination of Elena Kagan to be an Associate Justice of the Supreme Court of the United States: Hearing before the Committee on the Judiciary, United States Senate, One Hundred Eleventh Congress, Second Session, June 28-30 and July 1, 2010. Errata

Nominations to the United States Supreme Court
2010 in American law
2010 in American politics
2010 in the United States
111th United States Congress
Presidency of Barack Obama
Articles containing video clips